"Everybody" is a song by Canadian rock band Stabilo. Originally released from Stabilo Boss, and was again released on Cupid?. Both times it was a single, though much of the production of later versions seem to echo the direction of its 2000 Producer, Matthew J Doughty (sometimes credited as Matt Doughty).

Air time for Everybody, and Stabilo, started when a DJ at the Vancouver's XFM decided to play "Everybody" on their music competition show, Chaos. The song dominated the station's Top 7@7 charts for nearly a month. In 2004, the song was rerecorded during the Cupid? sessions at the historic Mushroom studios, with John Wozniak of Marcy Playground.

It was also re-released as a bonus track on their 2006 album Happiness and Disaster.

Chart positions

References

Stabilo (band) songs
2004 songs